Whitemarsh Island is a census-designated place (CDP) in Chatham County, Georgia, United States. The population was 6,983 at the 2020 U.S Census. It is part of the Savannah Metropolitan Statistical Area. The communities of Whitemarsh Island are a relatively affluent suburb of Savannah.

Geography

The Whitemarsh Island CDP is located at  (32.039482, -81.007850), occupying the island of the same name. It is bordered to the north by Richardson Creek, to the east by Turner Creek, and to the south and west by the Wilmington River, all of which are tidal water bodies. U.S. Route 80 crosses the island, leading west into Savannah and east to Tybee Island on the Atlantic shore. The Islands Expressway runs northwest from Whitemarsh Island  to downtown Savannah.

Demographics

2020 census

As of the 2020 United States census, there were 6,983 people, 2,752 households, and 1,704 families residing in the CDP.

2000 census
As of the census of 2000, there were 5,824 people, 2,302 households, and 1,609 families residing in the CDP. The racial makeup of the CDP was 82.19% White, 9.24% African American, 0.26% Native American, 5.75% Asian, 0.12% Pacific Islander, 1.01% from other races, and 1.43% from two or more races. Hispanic or Latino of any race were 2.40% of the population.

There were 2,302 households, out of which 34.8% had children under the age of 18 living with them, 59.1% were married couples living together, 7.7% had a female householder with no husband present, and 30.1% were non-families. 22.6% of all households were made up of individuals, and 4.2% had someone living alone who was 65 years of age or older.  The average household size was 2.53 and the average family size was 2.99.

In the CDP, the population was spread out, with 25.0% under the age of 18, 7.8% from 18 to 24, 34.8% from 25 to 44, 23.9% from 45 to 64, and 8.5% who were 65 years of age or older.  The median age was 36 years. For every 100 females, there were 96.2 males.  For every 100 females age 18 and over, there were 95.9 males.

The median income for a household in the CDP was $58,087, and the median income for a family was $73,704. Males had a median income of $47,083 versus $32,055 for females. The per capita income for the CDP was $31,529.  About 1.2% of families and 5.0% of the population were below the poverty line, including 2.1% of those under age 18 and 4.0% of those age 65 or over.

Neighborhoods

Long Point Plantation is located on Whitemarsh Island, just east of the intersection of US HWY 80 and Johnny Mercer Boulevard. It can be reached by driving east on US 80 or from the Islands Expressway.

Housing costs on Whitemarsh Island range from $150,000 to upwards of $2,900,000.

Education
It is in Savannah-Chatham County Public Schools. Schools include:
 Islands High School
 Coastal Middle School
 Marshpoint Elementary School

Live Oak Public Libraries operates the Islands Library.

References

Census-designated places in Chatham County, Georgia
Census-designated places in Georgia (U.S. state)
Savannah metropolitan area
Populated coastal places in Georgia (U.S. state)